Sam Alford born 23 November 1986 in England is a rugby union player for Bristol in the Guinness Premiership. He plays as a scrum-half. Alford signed for Bristol for the 2008/09 season and made his first team debut against Northampton Saints in the EDF cup. 
Previous Clubs:
Bath Rugby
West Brisbane Bulldogs
Cornish All Blacks
London Welsh (Loan Period)

References

External links
Bristol Rugby profile

Living people
1986 births
English rugby union players
Bristol Bears players